Empresa Nacional del Petróleo, or ENAP (English: National Petroleum Company) is a state-owned company in Chile, based in Las Condes. The company is engaged in the exploration, production, refining, and marketing of hydrocarbons and their derivatives. ENAP was created by Law No. 9618, on June 19, 1950. It was initially responsible for prospecting and exploiting oil in Tierra del Fuego and the Strait of Magellan, where deposits were discovered between 1945 and 1950.

The company's subsidiary, ENAP Refinerías, operates three refineries: Aconcagua, Bío Bío, and Gregorio. The three refineries supply over 80% of Chile's fuel needs.

Through another subsidiary, ENAP Sipetrol (International Petroleum Company), founded in 1990, the company has operations in Peru, Ecuador, Argentina, Iran and Egypt. International production is responsible for most of ENAP's crude oil supply, primarily from neighboring countries.

External links

Official website

Oil and gas companies of Chile
Chile
Energy companies established in 1950
Non-renewable resource companies established in 1950
Government-owned companies of Chile
Chilean companies established in 1950
1950 in Chilean law